The Dedicated Tour was the third concert tour by Canadian singer Carly Rae Jepsen. Launched in support of her fourth studio album, Dedicated (2019), the tour began on 23 May 2019 in Stockholm and traveled across North America, Europe, Asia, and Oceania.

Development
Jepsen first announced on 1 April 2019, that her upcoming album Dedicated would be released on 17 May 2019, and that she would embark on The Dedicated Tour in support of it. Copies of the album are included along with the purchased tickets. During the North American leg of the tour, one dollar from each ticket purchased will go to the Crisis Text Line and The Trevor Project in San Francisco. Extra dates in New York and Los Angeles were added on 2 April 2019. Canada dates were added on 23 May 2019, Asia dates were added on 7 July 2019, Oceania dates were added on 22 September 2019 and Europe dates were added on 3 December 2019.

Set list
The following set list is representative of the concert on 27 June 2019. It is not representative of all concerts for the duration of the tour.
"No Drug Like Me"
"Emotion"
"Run Away with Me"
"Julien"
"Happy Not Knowing"
"Call Me Maybe"
"Now That I Found You"
"Gimmie Love"
"Feels Right"
"I'll Be Your Girl"
"For Sure"
"Want You In My Room"
"Store"
"Too Much"
"When I Needed You"
"I Really Like You"
"Everything He Needs"
"Boy Problems"
"Party for One"
Encore
"All That"
"Let's Get Lost"
"Cut to the Feeling"

Notes
"Fever" was added to the set list replacing "I'll Be Your Girl" on July 6.
"Real Love" was added to the set list replacing "All That" on July 10.
"Feels Right" was performed with Asa Taccone of Electric Guest on August 10–11.

Tour dates

Cancelled shows

Broadcasts and recordings
Jepsen's performance on August 11, 2019, was streaming live on Live Nation's Twitter page as part of "Live Nation Concert Series".

Box office score data

Notes

References

Carly Rae Jepsen concert tours
2019 concert tours
2020 concert tours
Concert tours postponed due to the COVID-19 pandemic